Lake Bonneville is a reservoir on the Columbia River in the U.S. states of Oregon and Washington. It was created in 1937 with the construction of Bonneville Dam. The reservoir stretches between it and The Dalles Dam, upstream. It lies in parts of three counties in Oregon (Multnomah, Hood River, Wasco) and two in Washington (Skamania, Klickitat).

See also
 List of dams in the Columbia River watershed
 List of lakes in Oregon

References

Lakes of Hood River County, Oregon
Bodies of water of Klickitat County, Washington
Lakes of Multnomah County, Oregon
Reservoirs in Washington (state)
Reservoirs in Oregon
Lakes of Skamania County, Washington
Lakes of Wasco County, Oregon
Buildings and structures in Hood River County, Oregon
Buildings and structures in Klickitat County, Washington
Buildings and structures in Multnomah County, Oregon
Buildings and structures in Skamania County, Washington
Buildings and structures in Wasco County, Oregon
Protected areas of Hood River County, Oregon
Protected areas of Klickitat County, Washington
Protected areas of Multnomah County, Oregon
Protected areas of Skamania County, Washington
Protected areas of Wasco County, Oregon
1937 establishments in Oregon
1937 establishments in Washington (state)